Bell of Purity Temple is a 1992 Chinese film about the life of a Japanese infant deserted in China after Sino-Japanese War. It is presented by Shanghai Film Studio and directed by Xie Jin, starring Pu Cunxin, Komaki Kurihara, Ding Yi,  You Yong and Zhu Xu.

External links 

Bell of Purity Temple from the Chinese Movie Database

1992 films
1992 drama films
Films directed by Xie Jin
1990s Mandarin-language films
Shanghai Film Studio films
Chinese drama films